ProyectArte is an arts education nonprofit based in Buenos Aires, Argentina and in New York City. The organization operates a school for young artists between the ages of 15–29 in the Buenos Aires neighborhood of Villa Crespo, as well as an art gallery called Prima.

References

External links
ProyectArte

Arts organisations based in Argentina